Koçyatağı can refer to:

 Koçyatağı, Erzincan
 Koçyatağı, Şuhut